Opole Voivodeship, or Opole Province, is the smallest and least populated voivodeship (province) of Poland. The province's name derives from that of the region's capital and largest city, Opole. It is part of Upper Silesia. A relatively large German minority, with representatives in the Sejm, lives in the voivodeship, and the German language is co-official in 28 communes.

Opole Voivodeship is bordered by Lower Silesian Voivodeship to the west, Greater Poland and Łódź Voivodeships to the north, Silesian Voivodeship to the east, and the Czech Republic (Olomouc Region and Moravian-Silesian Region) to the south.

Opole Province's geographic location, economic potential, and its population's level of education make it an attractive business partner for other Polish regions (especially Lower Silesian and Silesian Voivodeships) and for foreign investors. Formed in 1997, the Praděd/Pradziad Euroregion with its headquarter in Prudnik has facilitated economic, cultural and tourist exchanges between the border areas of Poland and the Czech Republic.

History

Opole Voivodeship was created on January 1, 1999, out of the former Opole Voivodeship and parts of Częstochowa Voivodeship, pursuant to the Polish local government reforms adopted in 1998.
Originally, the government, advised by prominent historians, had wanted to disestablish Opolskie and partition its territory between the more historically Polish regions of Lower Silesia and Silesian Voivodeship (eastern Upper Silesia and western Malopolska. The plan was that Brzeg and Namysłów, as the Western part of the region, were to be transferred to Lower Silesia, while the rest was to become, along with a part of the Częstochowa Voivodeship, an integral part of the new 'Silesian' region. However, the plans resulted in an outcry from the German minority population of Opole Voivodeship, who feared that should their region be abolished, they would lose all hope of regional representation (in the proposed Silesian Region, they would have formed a very small minority among a great number of ethnic Poles). To the surprise of many of the ethnic Germans in Opole however, the local Polish Silesian population and groups of ethnic Poles also rose up to oppose the planned reforms; this came about as a result of an overwhelming feeling of attachment to the voivodeships that were scheduled to be 'redrawn', as well as a fear of 'alienation' should one find themselves residing in a new, unfamiliar region.

The solution came in late 1999, when Olesno was, after 24 years apart, finally reunited with the Opole Voivodeship to form the new legally defined region. A historic moment came in 2006 when the town of Radłów changed its local laws to make German, alongside Polish, the district's second official language; thus becoming the first town in the region to achieve such a feat.

Geography
The voivodeship lies in southwestern Poland, the major part on the Silesian Lowland. To the east, the region touches upon the Silesian Upland (Silesian Uplands) with the famous Saint Anne Mountain; the Sudetes range, the Opawskie Mountains, lies to the southwest. The Oder River cuts across the middle of the voivodeship. The northern part of the voivodeship, along the Mała Panew River, is densely forested, while the southern part consists of arable land.

The region has the warmest climate in the country.

Protected areas
Protected areas in Opole Voivodeship include the following three areas designated as Landscape Parks:
Opawskie Mountains Landscape Park
Góra Świętej Anny Landscape Park
Stobrawa Landscape Park

Climate

Administrative division
Opole Voivodeship is divided into 12 counties (powiats): 1 city county and 11 land counties. These are further divided into 71 gminas.

The counties are listed in the following table (ordering is by decreasing population).

Cities and towns
The voivodeship contains 2 cities and 34 towns. These are listed below in descending order of population (as of 2019):

Demographics
The Opole Voivodeship is the smallest region in the administrative makeup of the country in terms of both area and population.

About 15% of the one million inhabitants of this voivodeship are ethnic Germans, which constitutes 90% of all ethnic Germans in Poland. Towns with particularly high concentrations of German speakers include: Strzelce Opolskie; Dobrodzien; Prudnik; Głogówek; and Gogolin. As a result, many areas are officially bilingual and the German language and culture play a significant role in education in the region. Ethnic Germans first came to this region during the Late Middle Ages. The area was once part of the Prussian province of Silesia.

Economy

The Gross domestic product (GDP) of the province was 10.1 billion euros in 2018, accounting for 2.0% of Polish economic output. GDP per capita adjusted for purchasing power was 17,000 euros or 56% of the EU27 average in the same year. The GDP per employee was 66% of the EU average.

The Opole Voivodeship is an industrial as well as an agricultural region. With respect to mineral resources, of major importance are deposits of raw materials for building: limestone (Strzelce Opolskie), marl (near Opole), marble, and basalt. The favourable climate, fertile soils, and high farming culture contribute to the development of agriculture, which is among the most productive in the country.

A total of nineteen industries are represented in the voivodeship. The most important are cement and lime, furniture, food, car manufacturing, and chemical industries. In 1997, the biggest production growth in the area was in companies producing wood and wood products, electrical equipment, machinery and appliances, as well as cellulose and paper products. In 1997, the top company in the region was Zakłady Azotowe S.A. in Kędzierzyn-Koźle, whose income was over PLN 860 million. The voivodship's economy consists of more than 53,000 businesses, mostly small and medium-sized, employing over 332,000 people. Manufacturing companies employ over 89,000 people; 95.7% of all the region's business operate in the private sector.

Tourism

The Opole Voivodeship is a green region with three large lakes: Turawskie, Nyskie, and Otmuchów (the latter two are connected). The Opawskie Mountains between Prudnik and Głuchołazy are extremely popular. The region also includes the castle in Brzeg, built during the reign of the Piast dynasty—pearl of the Silesian Renaissance, the Franciscan monastery on top of Saint Anne Mountain, as well as the medieval defence fortifications in Paczków (referred to as the Upper Silesian Carcassonne).

International tourism
According to the Central Statistical Office of Poland, Opole Voivodeship is most frequently visited by international tourists from countries located in Europe (94.6%). The rank was followed by tourists from Asia, compromising 2.4% of the total international tourist figure, followed by that of North America at 1.8%. The general composition of international tourists visiting the Opole Voivodeship remains unchanged, with 46.2% of tourists heading from Germany.

International tourists visiting Opole Voivodeship with an overnight stay according to country of permanent residence:

In 2015, a total of c. 90,800 overnight stays were hosted for international tourists, a figure making up 12.4% of the total amount of overnight stays for Opole Voivodeship. The majority (44.7%) of international overnight stays were hosted in the city of Opole, followed by Kędzierzyn-Koźle County (9.9%) and Nysa County at (9.4%).

Transportation
The transport route from Germany to Ukraine, the A4, runs through Opole. The region has four border crossings, and direct rail connections to all important Polish cities, as well as to Frankfurt, Munich, Budapest, Kyiv, and the Baltic ports.

Universities
There are three state-run universities in the region: the Opole University, the Opole University of Technology, and the Public Higher Medical Professional School in Opole. All of them are based in the voivodeship's capital. Among the region's private schools, the Opole School of Management and Administration has been certified as a degree-granting institution by the Ministry of National Education.
 Opole University of Technology
 Opole University
 State Medical College
 Opole School of Management and Administration
 Bogdan Jański College
 The State Higher Vocational School in Nysa, PWSZ in NYSA

Surnames
Most popular surnames in Opole Voivodeship:
 Nowak: 5,538
 Wieczorek: 2,654
 Mazur: 2,512

Former Opole voivodeships

Opole Voivodeship (1975-1999)

Opole Voivodeship was also a unit of administrative division and local government in Poland between 1975 and 1998.

Major cities and towns (population in 1995):
 Opole, capital city (130,600)
 Kędzierzyn-Koźle (70,700)
 Nysa (49,000)
 Brzeg (39,900)
 Kluczbork (26,900)
 Prudnik (24,300)
 Strzelce Opolskie (21,900)
 Krapkowice (20,100)

Opole Voivodeship (1950–1975)
This administrative region of the People's Republic of Poland (1950–1975) was created as a result of the partition of Katowice Voivodeship in 1950.

See also

Opole cuisine
Śląsk Opolski
Upper Silesia
Silesia

References

External links
 Opolskie - photogallery
 Self-Government of the Opolskie Voivodeship
 Opolski Urząd Wojewódzki Official website

German-speaking countries and territories
 
1999 establishments in Poland
States and territories established in 1999